Ji Young "Pearl" Sinn-Bonanni (born July 17, 1967) is a Korean-American professional golfer who played on the LPGA Tour. She played under her maiden name, Pearl Sinn until her marriage in 2002.

Sinn was born in Seoul, South Korea. Her family moved to the United States when she was 9 and she became a U.S. citizen at age 14, renouncing her Korean citizenship.

Sinn had a very successful amateur career. She played college golf at Arizona State University where she was a three-time All-American. She won the U.S. Women's Amateur Public Links in 1988 and 1989 (after finishing runner-up in 1987) and the U.S. Women's Amateur in 1988. Sinn also played on the winning U.S. teams in the 1988 Curtis Cup and 1988 Espirito Santo Trophy.  Under USGA rules, the 1988 Women's Amateur win makes her eligible for the U.S. Senior Women's Open in 2018.

Sinn turned professional in 1989 and played on the Futures Tour and Ladies European Tour where she was Rookie of the Year in 1990.

Sinn played on the LPGA Tour from 1991 to 2005, winning once in 1998.

Sinn-Bonanni is currently head coach of the women's golf team at Cal State Fullerton.

Amateur wins
1988 U.S. Women's Amateur Public Links, U.S. Women's Amateur
1989 U.S. Women's Amateur Public Links

Professional wins

LPGA Tour wins (1)

KLPGA wins (1)
1999 BUY KOREA Ladies Open

U.S. national team appearances
Amateur
Curtis Cup: 1988
Espirito Santo Trophy: 1988 (winners)

References

External links

Profile on Arizona State Sun Devil's athletic site
Profile on Seoul Sisters site

South Korean female golfers
American female golfers
LPGA Tour golfers
Winners of ladies' major amateur golf championships
College golf coaches in the United States
Golfers from California
Golfers from Seoul
American sportspeople of Korean descent
Sportspeople from Manhattan Beach, California
1967 births
Living people
21st-century American women